Lidija Abrlić, married Gnjidić (born September 13, 1969 in Senj, SFR Yugoslavia) is a former Yugoslavian and Croatian basketball player.

External links
Profile at fiba.com

1969 births
Living people
People from Senj
Croatian women's basketball players
Yugoslav women's basketball players
Mediterranean Games gold medalists for Croatia
Mediterranean Games medalists in basketball
Competitors at the 1997 Mediterranean Games